Ryan Foltz is an American producer, audio engineer and musician from Mansfield, Ohio. Formerly of Dropkick Murphys (mandolin, dulcimer, tin whistle, etc.) and Motel Blonde (bass), Foltz has also played tin whistle, mandolin, and trumpet in The Pogues cover band, The Boys From The County Hell for over fifteen years.  He was also a member of the Bluecoats Drum and Bugle Corps.

Foltz was employed from 2006-2014 as touring monitor technician for Rancid, and has also toured doing sound for: Lars Frederiksen and the Bastards, Tim Armstrong, Dropkick Murphys, The Unseen, and Tiger Army, among others.

Foltz appears on Tim Armstrong's Tim Timebomb project, a large collection of cover and original songs recorded by Armstrong and various musician friends.

Foltz owns and operates Cleveland Audio Studios, now based in Sheffield Lake, OH.

References

Year of birth missing (living people)
Living people
Musicians from Ohio
Dropkick Murphys members